Darren Ian Lurie (born 22 May 1992) is a South African-Israeli footballer who plays as a forward for Shimshon Tel Aviv.

Early life
Lurie grew up in Johannesburg, South Africa, the grandson of a Holocaust survivor from Lithuania. At the age of 24, he made aliyah to Israel after being released by Black Aces of the South African Premiership.

References

External links
 

1992 births
Living people
Soccer players from Johannesburg
South African soccer players
South African Jews
Jewish footballers
Association football forwards
Moroka Swallows F.C. players
Cape Town City F.C. (2016) players
Hapoel Afula F.C. players
F.C. Ironi Or Yehuda players
Maccabi Yavne F.C. players
Shimshon Tel Aviv F.C. players
South African Premier Division players
Liga Leumit players
South African emigrants to Israel
South African people of Lithuanian-Jewish descent